Digital sheet music is technology for representing and displaying sheet music in a computer-readable format. With the emergence of several technological innovations, sheet music evolved in several stages into what was to be termed digital sheet music.

Music Notation Software
With the increased use of professional and personal computers during the 1980s, different programmers started working on desktop publishing music notation software. Various boxed music notation software applications appeared on the market, allowing users to input and edit sheet music digitally. In the beginning, the software only permitted printing on paper. It took some time before other virtual formats became possible (e.g. standard MIDI file, audio (wav, mp3) and MusicXML export). These files allowed manipulation such as instrument changes, transposition and even MIDI playback. In particular, software projects Finale and Sibelius grew to become successful commercial products and to define certain standards in digital music notation. Many free software projects also appeared (see list of scorewriters). Consequently, computer keyboard entry in combination with synthesizer keyboard entry became the most common method for music data entry in current digital use.

OMR
Optical music recognition (OMR) is software to “read” scanned sheet music. Although OMR contributed to the evolution of digital sheet music, it is currently still a complex problem. While the earliest attempts of OMR were made in the early 1970s, the first commercial products appeared in the early 90s. Currently, many commercial OMR tools are  available: SharpEye2, SmartScore, Photoscore, CapellaScan. OMR can be simplified into four smaller tasks: staff line identification, musical object location, musical feature classification and musical semantics. However, in most cases, these systems operate only properly with well-scanned documents of high quality. When it comes to precision and reliability, none of the commercial OMR systems solve the problem in a satisfactory way. Especially since the tradition of notating music is quite diffuse and varied, it remains difficult to reduce its aesthetics to a few principles for a machine to follow.

New commercial possibilities
With the emergence of electronic commerce in the 2000s, some traditional sheet publishers, as well as new entrants, developed online retailer websites to offer sheet music in an electronic manner. The first to offer the service online was Sheet Music Direct (1997) but quickly followed by MusicNotes and Sheet Music Score who were able to offer interactive features like transposition and change of instrument using scorch (Avid) technology. Newcomer Sheet Music Plus only recently (2011) entered the market, offering PDF files only. Those commercial services started as worldwide retailers with a large base of licensed sheet music and fast delivery, but progressively offered digital print, ranging from PDF-files to more dynamic offerings such as Scorch technology (Avid) which allowed for midi accompaniment, and on-the-fly change of keys and instruments. In addition, the popular use of digital sheet music required interchangeable digital formats. As such, MusicXML became a common format to share sheet music files between applications and to archive sheet music files for future use.

Apps
The digital revolution of the 2010s introduced widespread use of mobile networked devices, mobile telephony and tablet computers. Tablet computers, in particular, introduced new opportunities for digital sheet music through their usable digital display. Consequently, many iOS and Android apps were introduced in the sheet music market, offering digital sheet music on various mobile platforms. The first generation viewers displayed PDF-files with features such as basic annotations, exportation of those annotations to other PDF readers and printing scores. PDFs are “static” files: you can read the music as it appears on the page, and you can only modify the notes by drawing digital ink markings or by typing text on the page.

Cloud-based apps
Most recently, the rise of cloud computing is further pushing the development of digital sheet music and enables creating and sharing written music online. A cloud-based application is immediately available on the web on any type of computer and does not need to be installed. HTML5 in particular spurs cloud computing, allowing development of device independent web applications and making digital sheet music responsive and appropriate on large as well as on small screens. Cloud-based music notation applications facilitate the creation and sharing of written music. Additionally, other cloud-based applications focus more on the practice and consumption side of music learning. These latter cloud-based applications integrate audio-output such as playback with a variety of tempi (speeds) and with different instrumentation for multi-part scores and make the viewing and playing more interactive by adding personal annotations, automatic page turning, or set lists.

Reading digital sheet music

Overall, four factors appear to facilitate digital sheet reading: computer, content, containers and controllers:
 Computer: depending on the musical work or performance, different form factors might facilitate the digital sheet music consumption
 Content: a choice of static content versus dynamic content, and a choice of open content versus proprietary content. 
 Containers: hardware accessories used to hold or mount your computer
 Controllers: hardware accessories that enable you to work with your digital sheet music in a variety of ways, ranging from digital pens to draw annotations, to pedals and other switches that allow you to turn the pages without using your hands.

See also
 List of music software

References

Works cited
  

Audio file formats
Musical notation
Music software